"Selkie Stories Are for Losers" is a 2013 fantasy/magic realism short story by American writer Sofia Samatar, exploring the myth of the selkie from the perspective of those left behind. It was first published in Strange Horizons.

Synopsis
A young woman works in a restaurant, and reflects on her mother's disappearance, on how that disappearance bears an uncomfortable resemblance to the legend of the selkie, and on what this may mean for her budding romance with a coworker.

Reception
"Selkie Stories Are for Losers" was nominated for the 2014 Hugo Award for Best Short Story, the 2014 Nebula Award for Best Short Story, the 2014 World Fantasy Award—Short Fiction, and the 2014 BSFA Award for Short Fiction.

At Kirkus Reviews, Ana Grilo described the story as "subtle (...) with minimalistic worldbuilding" and "an almost poetic cadence", emphasizing the degree to which the story is about consent.

References

External links
 Text of the story at Strange Horizons

Fantasy short stories
2014 short stories